Bucoides erichsoni is a species of beetle in the family Cerambycidae. It was described by Martins in 1979. It is known from Peru and Ecuador.

References

Onciderini
Beetles described in 1979